Blue Crush 2 is a 2011 direct-to-video film directed by Mike Elliott and starring Sasha Jackson, Elizabeth Mathis, Ben Milliken, Chris Fisher, Gideon Emery, and Sharni Vinson. Despite the title, it is not considered to be connected to the 2002 film Blue Crush. Film reviews were generally negative.

Plot

After looking through her dead mother's diary filled with pictures of her time surfing in South Africa, Dana (Sasha Jackson) decides to leave California to travel there, surfing everywhere her mother did as well as Jeffreys Bay, where her mother always wanted to surf but never did.  Dana leaves while her father (Gideon Emery) is away on a business trip taking a wooden carving with her. On her plane ride there, she meets Grant (Chris Fisher) and he tells her to look him up if she is in his area.  After landing, Dana gets on a bus headed for the beach and is followed by a man that tries to take her backpack.  When he tries to sit next to her, she calls to a girl around her age that just boarded the bus saying she saved her a seat. Pushy (Elizabeth Mathis) introduces herself and they go surfing together after Dana puts her backpack in a locker. On the water they meet Tara (Sharni Vinson) and Chris Wigmore, stuck-up Roxy surfers. After some confrontation, Pushy leaves and Dana beats Tara for a wave. On the next wave Tara cuts in on Dana, causing her to break her board that was her mother's and cannot be replaced.

Once back on the beach, Dana finds that her locker was broken into and her money and wooden carving (belonging to her mother) were stolen. Pushy takes a depressed Dana back to her place, a group of huts on the beach where she and other surfers live. Tara also lives there and continues to be mean to Dana. At the same time, policemen arrive and give the surfers one week to vacate the premises. Dana meets Tim (Ben Milliken) and he instantly takes a liking to her. After a nap there is a party that night and while Tim is trying to talk to Dana she spots Grant from the plane and dances with and kisses him. The next day she tells them about her mom and how she wants to take pictures of herself at all the same places her mom did. Tara bets her a hundred dollars that she won't be able to do it and Pushy agrees to travel with Dana on her "odyssey". Grant lets them borrow his truck in exchange for working at his restaurant. As they are about to leave, Tim gives Dana a Polaroid camera so that the pictures will be the same and her board that he repaired. After each surfing destination they return to the beach house and soon there is only Jeffreys Bay (J-Bay) left where Dana will fulfill her mother's dream and Pushy will try out for the Roxy team.

While waiting for the right weather to leave for J-Bay, Dana works and one day she thinks she sees the man that stole her possessions. He is talking to Grant but Grant says he doesn't know the man. That night Dana and Pushy travel to the part of town Pushy is from to go dancing. While there Dana is confronted by the man who stole her possessions and she and Pushy follow him and find Grant's truck filled with elephant tusks. The men chase them and they barely get away. Pushy then gets mad at Dana and says she is dangerous and on her own for J-Bay. After their fight, Dana rips down all the odyssey pictures from the wall. The next morning the police come back, this time with bulldozers, to tear down the illegal beach hut where they live. After getting out, Dana and Pushy reconcile. Tim gets his bus working and they decide that everyone will drive to J-Bay. On the bus Tim has the odyssey pictures that he saved from the demolition and he and Dana grow closer. One night while everyone is gathered around a fire Dana and Tim go off and he sings her a song he wrote her and they fall in love.

Meanwhile, Dana's father finds her gone and comes to South Africa looking for her. He ends up at the torn-down beach hut and is told they went to J-Bay so he flies there to find her. Dana's father then finds her and they get in a fight. While Tim and Pushy are consoling her they run into a beach party that Grant and Tara are at. Tim confronts Grant about the elephant tusks (Tim works with the elephants) and they get into a fist fight that Tim wins.  The next day Pushy tries out for the Roxy surf team and wins using that 360 aerial move that Dana has been teaching her. Tara puts aside their differences and congratulates her. Tara also returns the wooden carving to Dana that she found among Grant's things. That night Dana's father comes back and after making up she shows him the pictures of her odyssey and gives him the wooden carving. They then go to the beach and drop her mother's ashes out the carving (an urn). The next day Dana goes to surf J-Bay that has very big waves and is a boy's club. Once out there Grant gets the guys to let her stay and after getting crushed on her first wave, she has a great ride with Tim, Pushy, and her dad watching her. They then take a picture together and her dad says that he is proud of her and that her mother would be, too. The film ends with Dana and everybody back on the bus and heading on their next location.

Cast
 Sasha Jackson as Dana
 Elizabeth Mathis as Pushy
 Ben Milliken as Tim
 Sharni Vinson as Tara
 Chris Fisher as Grant
 Gideon Emery as Joel (Dana's Dad)
 Rodger Halston as Cowboy

References

External links
 
 

2010s English-language films
2011 films
Films about women's sports
American surfing films
Films set on beaches
Films set in South Africa
Films shot in South Africa
Direct-to-video sequel films
Universal Pictures direct-to-video films
Films scored by J. Peter Robinson
2011 drama films
Films directed by Mike Elliott
2010s American films